Major-General Sir Horace de Courcy Martelli  (17 July 1877 – 11 March 1959) was a British Army officer who became Lieutenant Governor of Jersey.

Military career
Educated at the Haileybury (1887-1891), Bedford School (1891-1895), and at the Royal Military Academy Sandhurst, Martelli won the Royal Humane Society's Bronze Medal when aged twenty for rescuing a boy from drowning at Southsea on 2 August 1897. He was commissioned into the Royal Artillery in 1912, and served in World War I as deputy director of Railway Transport for the British Expeditionary Force, as Deputy Assistant Quartermaster General at General Headquarters of the British Expeditionary Force and then as Deputy Assistant Quartermaster General for 25th Division before becoming Assistant Quartermaster General for 9th Army Corps in France in 1916. He continued his war service as Temporary Assistant Adjutant General at the War Office from 1917 and than as Assistant Director Mobilisation at the War Office from 1918.

He went on to be Assistant Director Quartering at the War Office in 1920, Assistant Quartermaster General at Eastern Command in 1921 and Commander, Royal Artillery for 42nd (East Lancashire) Division in 1925. He was appointed Base Commandant for the Shanghai Defence Force in China in 1927 before reverting to the role of Commander, Royal Artillery for 42nd (East Lancashire) Division again in 1928. His last appointments were as Major-General in charge of Administration at Southern Command in Salisbury in 1930 and as Lieutenant Governor of Jersey in 1934 before he retired in 1939.

In retirement he commanded 8th Bn Wiltshire Home Guard.

Family
In 1904 he married Ethel Mary Douglas.

References

1877 births
1959 deaths
British Army personnel of World War I
British Home Guard soldiers
British Army major generals
Knights Commander of the Order of the British Empire
Companions of the Order of the Bath
Companions of the Distinguished Service Order
Royal Artillery officers
Governors of Jersey
Graduates of the Royal Military College, Sandhurst
People educated at Bedford School